{{DISPLAYTITLE:C18H24O4}}
The molecular formula C18H24O4 (molar mass: 304.38 g/mol, exact mass: 304.1675 u) may refer to:

 Estetrol (15α-hydroxyestriol)
 2-Hydroxyestriol
 4-Hydroxyestriol, or estra-1,3,5(10)-triene-3,4,16α,17β-tetrol